Jeff Kite (born March 19, 1979) is an American musician, composer, producer and member of the band, The Voidz.<ref>Murray, Nick. [https://www.rollingstone.com/music/premieres/julian-casablancas-and-the-voidz-tyranny-stream-20140919 "Hear Julian Casablancas + the Voidz' Wonderfully Bizarre New LP 'Tyranny] Rolling Stone , September 19, 2014.</ref>

Career

Julian Casablancas (Phrazes for the Young)
In 2009, Julian Casablancas released his debut solo record, Phrazes for the Young. Kite joined Casablancas’ touring band, The Sick Six, as a keyboard and guitar player. Between tours, he began writing new songs with Casablancas and drummer, Alex Carapetis, in a studio New York City. Many of their demos eventually became songs on the debut Voidz album, Tyranny.

The Voidz
After touring extensively with Julian Casablancas in 2009, Jeff once again joined forces with The Strokes frontman on his new project, The Voidz. They began recording their debut album, Tyranny, in 2013 in New York City. The album was released on September 23, 2014. The first single to be released was the 11 minute song, “Human Sadness”. Included with the song’s release was a music video co-directed by Warren Fu and Nicholuas Goossen. The second single that the band released was, “Where No Eagles Fly”. They performed the song on The Tonight Show and Le Gran Journal. Tyranny peaked inside the US Top 40 albums chart at No. 39.  

In December 2017, the band announced a name change from "Julian Casablancas + The Voidz" to "The Voidz".

Virtue is the second studio album by The Voidz. This time the band recorded in Los Angeles. It was released on March 30, 2018, through Cult Records and RCA. “Leave It In My Dreams,” was the first single to be released and they performed the song on The Tonight Show Starring Jimmy Fallon. The band toured extensively and appeared on several late night shows to promote the album. 

In 2019, The Voidz collaborated with Mac DeMarco who produced two songs, “Did My Best” and “T.E.T” that were released on Terrible Records. T.E.T was used as the theme song for The Mets 2021 MLB season. 

In late 2020, The Voidz premiered a new song "Alien Crime Lord" in the video game Grand Theft Auto V.

Beat Club
Jeff acts as the lead vocalist and also plays keyboards in Beat Club.  Their first single, 'Something Better,' was released in February 2013 on Boombox Recordings (PCM/Mom+Pop).  In Fall 2013, Beat Club toured the US with Fitz and the Tantrums and Capital Cities. In February 2016, Noisey released the band's most recent single, 'New Age Kid,' citing the tracks 'psych-pop swagger' and the 'Lennon-lean of his [Kite's] voice.' 

Studio Work
In 2013, Jeff worked in the studio on Vicky Cryer's debut release, The Synthetic Love of Emotional Engineering''. Vicky Cryer is helmed by Jason Hill (of Louis XIV).  Also recruited for the project was current drummer for The Voidz, Alex Carapetis, along with Dominic Howard (of Muse), Mark Stoermer (of The Killers), Nick Fyffe (of Jamiroquai) and Dave Elitch (of Mars Volta).

He is currently the producer and keyboardist in the instrumental trio, Coastal Kites.

Film Work
In 2008, Jeff Kite composed the score for No Subtitles Necessary, a film that follows the lives of renowned cinematographers László Kovacs and Vilmos Zsigmond as they escape from the 1956 Soviet invasion of Hungary to present day. It premiered at the 2008 Cannes International Film Festival and was a part of the Independent Lens series on PBS.  He also composed music for the documentary, Rio Breaks; a film that explores surfing and slum-life in Rio de Janeiro. The soundtrack was released on Mr. Bongo Records.

References

External links
 Julian Casablancas+The Voidz Official Website

Living people
1979 births